A silkwoman was a woman in medieval, Tudor, and Stuart England who traded in silks and other fine fabrics.<ref>Marian K. Dale, 'The London Silkwomen of the Fiftenth Century', Econmomic History Reveiw', 4 (1933), pp. 324-5.</ref> London silkwomen held some trading rights independently from their husbands and were exempted from some of the usual customs and laws of coverture. The trade and craft of the silkwoman was encouraged by a statute of Henry VI of England as a countermeasure to imports of silk thread, and a suitable occupation for "young gentlewomen and other apprentices".
Silkwomen in London

In 1421 Alice Corsmaker paid 6s-8d to the Mercer's Company of London to trade as a silkwoman. Alice Bradbridge was recognised as a "sister" of the Worshipful Company of Drapers.

Silkwomen in London manufactured silk thread from raw silk imported from Italy, wove and sold ribbons, braids, cord, girdles, and trimmings, called "narrow ware", and made other silk goods.  In the Elizabeth period, silkwomen also provided linen goods including lawn sleeves and partlets.

Silkwomen supplying the royal wardrobe
Anne Claver (died 1489) was a silkwoman to Edward IV. She supplied silk thread for sewing or embroidery, ribbons, a mantle of blue silk lace, and wove silk thread into laces and tassels to be applied to bookbindings. She made a silk fringe in yellow, green, red, white, and blue. She may have supplied five counterpoints for covering beds, with imagery, scripture, and verdure, and four "costerings" or wallhangings chequered in red and blue with roses, suns, and crowns. She made tufts of silk to decorate the coronation gloves of Richard III, and buttons for his and Anne Neville's robes.

Cecily Walcot worked on furnishings and decorations for the coronation of Henry VII in October 1485. Walcot provided fringes of gold and silk thread for the royal canopy. Kateryn Champyon alias'' Claver made ribbons for the king's girdles, and Kateryn Walshe supplied fringes and ribbon, some in the green and white Tudor colours. Agnes Dey or Sey and Alice Claver provided red ribbons. 

Elizabeth Langton, Elizabeth Lock, Jane Lock, Margaret Ashley, and Elizabeth Worssop supplied the royal wardrobe in the years 1498 to 1511. Elizabeth Lock provided a black velvet hoods for Lady Catherine Gordon, the widow of Perkin Warbeck, in October 1498 and in March 1499, and in November 1498 and April 1499 black velvet bonnets with a gold border and partlets for Lady Anne Percy, one the gentlewomen attending Elizabeth of York. Elizabeth Worssop made gold fringes for hose worn by Henry VII in 1510. in November 1510 Margaret Ashley supplied coloured ribbons and sarcenet silk fabric in several colours for tippets worn by Mary Tudor, then known as the "Princess of Castile".

Joan Wilkinson provided silks for Anne Boleyn. Margaret or Margery Guinet (died 1544), mother of Anne Lok, was a silkwoman to Anne Boleyn and Catherine Parr. Marie Wilkinson was a silkwoman to Mary I of England, Alice Smythe and Alice Montague served Elizabeth I and the royal wardrobe. Dorothy Speckard was Elizabeth's silkwoman from 1601, and she continued to work for Anne of Denmark. Another silkwoman serving Anne of Denmark in London was the French-born Esther or Hester Le Tellier née Granges, who is thought to have been the aunt of the miniature painter David des Granges. She had an annual salary of £20 in 1606.

Alice Montague and the clothes of Elizabeth I
Alice Montague was paid for hemming and edging Elizabeth's partlets, and starching the queen's sleeves and ruffs. She was paid for blackwork embroidery on the queen's smocks and collars. In 1564, Alice Montague supplied plain Holland linen for the use of Elizabeth's laundry woman or laundress, "24 elles of holland for oure Laundresse to drie our Partelettes'. Montague employed a woman "in altering and translating" the queen's partlets.

References

External links
 Anne F. Sutton, 'Alice Claver, Silkwoman of London and Maker of Mantle Laces for Richard III and Queen Anne', The Ricardian, 5 (1970), pp. 243–47
 'Silkwoman', Textile Resarch Centre, Leiden
 Matthew Wills, 'The Silkwomen of Medieval London', JSTOR Daily
 Latin wardrobe account of Mary I of England including payments to Marie Wilkinson, BnF Gallica Anglais 176

Silkwomen
Women and employment
16th-century businesswomen